Monochamus kinabaluensis is a species of beetle in the family Cerambycidae. It was described by Karl-Ernst Hüdepohl in 1996. It is known from Borneo.

References

kinabaluensis
Beetles described in 1996